Mastigoteuthis grimaldii is a species of whip-lash squid.

References

Joubin, L. 1895. Contribution a l'étude des Céphalopodes de l'Atlantique Nord. Résultats des Campagnes scientifiques accomplies sur son yacht par Albert I Prince souverain de Monaco 9: 1-63.

External links

Tree of Life web project: Mastigoteuthis grimaldii

Mastigoteuthis
Molluscs described in 1895